High Tide may refer to:

 High tide, the state of tide when the water rises to its highest level

Film and television
 High Tide (1947 film), an American film noir
 High Tide (1987 film), an Australian drama film
 High Tide (TV series), 1994–1997
 "High Tide", a 1989 episode of Tugs
 The Reef 2: High Tide, a 2012 South Korean-American computer animated film

Music
 High Tide (band), an English rock band formed in 1969 
 High Tide (album), 1970
 High Tide (Justin Nozuka album), 2017
 High Tide (EP), by Harry Fraud, 2013
 "High Tide", a song by Holly Miranda from the 2010 album The Magician's Private Library

Other uses
 High Tide (G.I. Joe), a fictional character

See also

 Tide (disambiguation)
 Rising Tide (disambiguation)
 High Water (disambiguation)